GPT-4  is a multimodal large language model created by OpenAI and the fourth in its GPT series. It was released on March 14, 2023, and has been made publicly available in a limited form via ChatGPT Plus. As a transformer, GPT-4 was pretrained to predict the next token (using both public data and "data licensed from third-party providers"), and was then fine-tuned with reinforcement learning from human and AI feedback for human alignment and policy compliance.

Microsoft confirmed that versions of Bing using GPT had in fact been using GPT-4 before its official release.

Training and capabilities 
OpenAI stated in their blog post announcing GPT-4 that it is "more reliable, creative, and able to handle much more nuanced instructions than GPT-3.5." The organization produced two versions of GPT-4 with context windows of 8192 and 32768 tokens, a significant improvement over GPT-3.5 and GPT-3, which were limited to 4096 and 2049 tokens respectively. Unlike its predecessors, GPT-4 can take images as well as text as input; this gives it the ability to describe the humor in unusual images, summarize screenshotted text, and answer exam questions that contain diagrams. 

In order to gain further control over the GPT-4 models, OpenAI introduced the concept of a "system message", a directive in natural language that can be given to chat-optimized versions of GPT-4 in order to prescribe their tone of voice as well as task. For example, the system directive can instruct the model to "be a Shakespearean pirate", in which case it will respond in rhyming, Shakespearean prose, or request it to "always write the output of [its] response in JSON", in which case it will do so, adding keys and values as it sees fit to match the structure of the model's reply. In the examples provided by OpenAI, the model refused to deviate from its system directive despite requests to do otherwise by the user during the conversation.

OpenAI adopted a closed approach with regards to the technical details of GPT-4; the technical report explicitly refrained from specifying the model size, architecture, or hardware used during either training or inference. In addition, while the report described that the model was trained using a combination of first supervised learning on a large dataset, then reinforcement learning using both human and AI feedback, it did not provide any further details of the training, including the process by which the training dataset was constructed, the computing power required, or any hyperparameters such as the learning rate, epoch count, or optimizer(s) used. The report claimed that "the competitive landscape and the safety implications of large-scale models" were factors that influenced this decision. 

U.S. Representatives Don Beyer and Ted Lieu confirmed to the New York Times that Sam Altman, CEO of OpenAI, visited Congress in January 2023 to demonstrate GPT-4 and its improved "security controls" compared to other AI models.

Reception 
The New York Times wrote that GPT-4 showed large improvements in accuracy compared to GPT-3.5, had gained the ability to summarize and comment on images, was able to summarize complicated texts, passed a bar exam and several standardized tests, but still showed a tendency to hallucinate answers.

EU institutions have been monitoring the release of GPT-4 as they propose the introduction of the Artificial Intelligence Act.

Criticisms 
OpenAI revealed fewer technical details about GPT-4 than it did for previous models, a decision which has been criticized by other AI researchers, who argue that it hinders open research into GPT-4's biases and safety. Sasha Luccioni, a research scientist at HuggingFace, argued that the model was a "dead end" for the scientific community due to its closed nature, which prevents others from building upon GPT-4's improvements. Hugging Face co-founder Thomas Wolf argued that with GPT-4, "OpenAI is now a fully closed company with scientific communication akin to press releases for products".

Usage 
For 20 USD per month, ChatGPT Plus provides access to a GPT-4 backed version of ChatGPT, the original version being backed by GPT-3.5. OpenAI also makes GPT-4 available to a select group of applicants through their GPT-4 API waitlist; after being accepted, an additional fee of 0.03 USD per 1000 tokens in the initial text provided to the model ("prompt"), and 0.06 USD per 1000 tokens that the model generates ("completion"), is required to use the version of the model with a 8192-token context window; for the 32768-token version, the prices are doubled. 

Microsoft confirmed that versions of Bing using GPT had in fact been using GPT-4 before its official release. On March 17, Microsoft announced further integration of GPT-4 into its products, revealing Microsoft 365 Copilot, "embedded in the apps millions of people use everyday: Word, Excel, PowerPoint, Outlook, Teams, and more".

Duolingo added GPT-4 to its application, and added two new features, "Roleplay" and "Explain My Answer". It currently works only for English speakers who learn French or Spanish.

Icelandic start-up Miðeind ehf, that works on language preservation, was selected by OpenAI as one of 6 companies to participate in early beta test program of the new model.

Khan Academy is using GPT-4 to create a tutoring chatbot, which the organization names "Khanmigo". While in the "research phase", access to the chatbot is provided free to the students and teachers of 500 school districts who have "partnered" with Khan Academy. Public access is only offered to a limited number of users selected from a waitlist; after acceptance, a 20 USD per month fee, which Khan Academy explains as "a donation...to help us develop this and other online educational resources", is required to use the technology.

Be My Eyes, which helps visually impaired people to identify objects and navigate their surroundings, was the first app to incorporate GPT-4's image recognition capabilities, through a new "Virtual Volunteer" feature. The new feature is presented as an alternative to relying on human volunteers for the same tasks. The Be My Eyes "Virtual Volunteer" is in beta testing.

Notes

References 

OpenAI
Large language models
2023 software